The Former Wheeler County Courthouse in Bartlett, Nebraska was built in 1918.  It was listed on the National Register of Historic Places in 1990.

It has elements of Mission Revival style, and was in fact the only known courthouse in Nebraska of that style.  It has a hipped roof with a broad overhang, which was originally of red tiles.  Other elements of Mission Revival style include the building's "massing, materials, simplicity of form, broad eaves, and long slender pairs of brackets. The brackets adorn pilasters at the corners and also the entrance."  Another feature is a Palladian window over the front entrance.

The former district courtroom is on the second floor.

In 1989, the former courthouse was in use as a museum  by the Wheeler County Historical Society "to commemorate county government and pioneer life in Wheeler County."  The present courthouse of Wheeler County was built adjacent.

References

External links

 Nebraska Museums Association: South Central NE Museums - see listing for Wheeler County Historical Society/Courthouse Museum

Historic districts on the National Register of Historic Places in Nebraska
Mission Revival architecture in Nebraska
Government buildings completed in 1918
Buildings and structures in Wheeler County, Nebraska
Courthouses in Nebraska
Museums in Wheeler County, Nebraska